Krasny is a rural locality (a settlement) in Krasnologskoye Rural Settlement, Anninsky District, Voronezh Oblast, Russia. The population was 32 as of 2010.

Geography 
Krasny is located 54 km east of Anna (the district's administrative centre) by road. Krasny Log is the nearest rural locality.

References 

Rural localities in Anninsky District